The 2008 FIFA Futsal World Cup–First Round took place from 30 September to 9 October 2008.

Group A

Group B

Group C

Group D 

- First Round, 2008 Fifa Futsal World Cup